Spokane University was a four-year liberal arts college that operated from 1913 to 1933. It was founded in 1912 by Mr. B. E. Utz and Mr. W. D. Willoughby as Spokane Bible College.  Mr. Utz worked at Eugene Bible University in Eugene, Oregon from 1909 to 1911 before moving back to Spokane. Spokane University was created to train ministers for the Christian Churches in Washington State.  Because of financial difficulties during the Great Depression, in 1934 it merged with Eugene Bible College to become Northwest Christian College in Eugene, Oregon, now known as Bushnell University.

During its existence, Spokane University conferred degrees on 112 men and 100 women.  Forty-six of the men were ordained.  It was organized as three colleges: Bible, Liberal Arts, and Fine Arts.

The facilities were sold to Spokane Junior College which moved into the city of Spokane from its original location in the Spokane Valley to the former site of Spokane College on Spokane's South Hill. The former site of the university, twenty-three acres at Ninth and Herald Streets, was the home of University High School from 1963–2002.  The former site of Spokane University is now considered the old U-High as University High School has moved to a new location on 32nd Avenue.

Presidents
 B. E. Utz, 1912–1914
 Isaac N. McCash, 1914–1916
 Andrew M. Meldrum, 1916–1922
 Chester V. Dunn, 1922–1924
 Roy K. Roadruck, 1924–1932
 A. G. Sater, 1932–1933

Notable alumni
Clyfford Still, class of 1933, an American painter, one of the leading figures in abstract expressionism.
Donald H. Magnuson, attended 1926 to 1928, a 5-term Representative in the United States congressional delegations from Washington.
George B. Thomas, professor of mathematics at MIT and author of a classic calculus textbook.

References

Defunct private universities and colleges in Washington (state)
Education in Spokane, Washington
Educational institutions established in 1913
1913 establishments in Washington (state)
Educational institutions disestablished in 1933